Gornja Bioča may refer to:

 Gornja Bioča (Hadžići), a village in Bosnia and Herzegovina
 Gornja Bioča (Ilijaš), a village in Bosnia and Herzegovina